Sigmund Snopek III (born 1950) is an American musician and composer.

Career
Snopek began his career in the late 1960s with a prog-rock band called Bloomsbury People. He has since created concept albums, pop songs, and classical compositions. Along the way, he performed and recorded with The Violent Femmes. In 2015, he was inducted into the Wisconsin Area Music Industry Hall of Fame.

Snopek composed a jazz symphony to celebrate the 150th anniversary of the founding of Waukesha, Wisconsin, which was performed at the University of Wisconsin–Waukesha on August 12, 1984. Snopek's works often have a local Milwaukee flavor to them, such as a song named for Robin Yount on his Baseball album. His classical works have been performed by many organizations in Milwaukee, including the Milwaukee Symphony Orchestra and Milwaukee Chamber Orchestra.

Discography

References

Living people
Musicians from Milwaukee
Avant-pop musicians
1950 births
20th-century American composers
20th-century American male musicians
21st-century American composers
21st-century American male musicians